The mixed team sprint C1–5 track cycling event at the 2020 Summer Paralympics took place at the Izu Velodrome, Japan. The C category is for cyclists with a physical impairment (muscle power or range of motion, and impairments affecting the coordination) that prevents them from competing in able-bodied competition but still competes using a standard bicycle. 27 cyclist from 9 different nations participated in this event. The distance for this event will be 750m.

Competition format
27 cyclist from 9 nations, 3 cyclists per team, is to be competing in the event. The 3 cyclists in a team can be all male, all female, or male and female. The three cyclists must be chosen from any of the C category events (C1-5) and more than one cyclist can be chosen from the same category. The full distance of this event is 750m or 3 laps so this would mean that 1 cyclist has to do 250m or one lap. All three will be group together when on track with the first cycler at the front while the other two behind follow, after the first cycler has completed one lap, he gets off the track and the next one behind takes the lead and cycles another one lap with the last cycler following behind, after the second complete one lap and gets off, the last cycler takes the lead and finishes off doing another one lap.

The event would start with a qualifying round, where each team in their own individual heat (so 1 heat has 1 team) would race off on a time-trial basis. In this case, the 2 fastest teams would qualify for the gold medal match to race for the gold medal, while the 3rd and 4th fastest teams would go compete in the bronze medal match to race for the bronze medal.

Schedule
All times are Japan Standard Time (UTC+9)

The mixed team sprint C1–5 will be take place on a single day.

Records

Results

Qualifying

Final

References

Mixed team sprint C1-5